Nepal Internet Governance Forum is a initiative of the Internet Governance Forum with the overall concept of multistakeholderism and Internet for development and growth. The Nepal IGF declaration was signed on 21 February 2017 where a multistakeholder steering committee (MSG) has been formed for the commencement of the Nepal IGF in June 2017.

Signatories of Nepal IGF

Nepal IGF 2019
Program Committee 
Hempal Shrestha 
Eswari Sharma
Jyotsana Maskey
Sahajman Shrestha
Shreedeep Rayamajhi
Amrita Khakurel
Ramkrishna Pariyar
Prabesh Subedi

Nepal IGf 2018
Program Committee 
Hempal Shrestha (Coordinator)
Indivar Badal
Jyotsana Maskey
Sahajman Shrestha
Shehnaj Banu
Shiwa Karmacharya
Shiva Kumar Pokhrel
Shreedeep Rayamajhi

Nepal IGF 2017 
Program Committee 
Babu Ram Aryal
Bikram Shrestha
Binod Dhakal
Dr. Sanjeev Pandey
Kishor Panth
Sarita Bhushal
Sahajman Shrestha
Shreedeep Rayamajhi
Subhash Dhakal

References

External links
Official website 
Shreedeep Rayamajhi speaking at one of the session of Nepal IGF2017
Proposal of Nepal IGF
Internet Governance issues in Nepal – discussion hosted by Internet Society Nepal

Internet governance organizations
Internet Standards
Organizations established in 2017